Speckle-type POZ protein is a protein that in humans is encoded by the SPOP gene.

This gene encodes a protein that may modulate the transcriptional repression activities of death-associated protein 6 (DAXX), which interacts with histone deacetylase, core histones, and other histone-associated proteins. In mouse, the encoded protein binds to the putative leucine zipper domain of macroH2A1.2, a variant H2A histone that is enriched on inactivated X chromosomes. The BTB/POZ domain of this protein has been shown in other proteins to mediate transcriptional repression and to interact with components of histone deacetylase co-repressor complexes. Alternative splicing of this gene results in multiple transcript variants encoding the same protein.

Clinical relevance 

Mutations in SPOP lead to a type of prostate tumor thought to be involved in about 15% of all prostate cancers.

References

Further reading